The  is a Japanese imperial anthology of waka poetry. It was finished somewhere around 1320 CE, two  years after the Retired Emperor Go-Uda first ordered it in 1318. It was compiled by Fujiwara no Tameyo (who also compiled the Shingosen Wakashū, and was a member of the older conservative Nijō). It consists of twenty volumes containing 2,159 poems.

References
pg. 485 of Japanese Court Poetry, Earl Miner, Robert H. Brower. 1961, Stanford University Press, LCCN 61-10925

Japanese poetry anthologies
1320s in Japan
14th-century literature